Asturian Americans are citizens of the United States who are of Asturian ancestry.

History

First Americans 
The first Asturian immigrants came to North America as soldiers, officers and settlers with the Spanish Army in the wake of Spain's conquest of what is today Florida, Mexico and the southwestern US. Some came directly to areas that would eventually become American territory, while others came to the present-day US via Mexico or Cuba. 
Saint Augustine, the oldest continuously occupied European-founded city anywhere in the continental United States, was founded by the Asturian Pedro Menéndez de Avilés. His expedition consisted of 2,000 settlers; at least forty of them were Asturians, mostly soldiers and from various areas of Asturias (mainly from Avilés, Ribadesella and Villaviciosa). 

The first known child of European descent to be born in what is now the continental US was Martín de Argüelles, born in 1566 in Saint Augustine to Asturian parents. Several of the first colonial governors of Florida were Asturians, including Menéndez de Avilés, Hernando de Miranda, Rodrigo del Junco, Pedro Menéndez Márquez, Juan Menéndez Márquez and Juan Treviño de Guillamas.

Modern immigration 

In the early decades of the 20th century thousands of Asturians left Spain and Cuba and came to work in the thriving tobacco industry of Tampa, Florida, or the zinc and coal mines of West Virginia and Pennsylvania. These Asturian immigrants organized themselves in tight-knit communities, setting up clubs and welfare organizations to provide and care for its members.

One such club is the Centro Asturiano de Tampa, a historic site in Ybor City, Tampa, Florida. It is located at 1913 Nebraska Avenue. Established in 1902, it was added to the National Register of Historic Places on July 24, 1974. It was designed by Tampa architect M. Leo Elliott.

On Asturian immigration, the "Asturian-American Migration Forum" states:

2010 US Census
The 2010 US Census failed to include an Asturian category, leaving Asturian-Americans with the only choice of checking the Hispanic category, unlike Basques or Scotch-Irish Americans, who, even though they do not come from independent countries, are recognized by the US Census with their own categories.

This caused some controversy at the "Asturian-American Migration Forum", as one member recalls:

Another member clarified the feelings of the Asturian community at the US Census' lack of sensibility with their heritage:

Notable people

Artists
Mabel Alvarez (November 28, 1891 – March 13, 1985), painter.

Entertainment
Gloria Estefan (born September 1, 1957), Cuban-born singer-songwriter, actress and entrepreneur.
Eva Longoria (born March 15, 1975), actress.
Frankie Muniz (Francisco Muniz IV, born December 5, 1985), actor, musician, writer, producer and race car driver.
Paloma Bloyd (born March 6, 1988), actress.
Jason Molina (December 30, 1973 – March 16, 2013), musician and singer-songwriter. Founder of Songs: Ohia and Magnolia Electric Co.

Lawyers, historians and writers
Alfred-Maurice de Zayas (born May 31, 1947), American lawyer, writer, historian, a leading expert in the field of human rights and international law.

Military
Baldomero Lopez (August 23, 1925 – September 15, 1950) was a first lieutenant in the United States Marine Corps during the Korean War.

Miscellanea
Martín de Argüelles (1566–1630), first known child of European descent born in what is now the continental US.
Manuel A. Gonzalez (1832–1902), Asturian-born steamship captain who was one of the first permanent settlers of Fort Myers, Florida.

Politicians
Bob Martínez (December 25, 1934) was the  40th Governor of Florida from 1987 to 1991 and the mayor of Tampa from 1979 to 1986. Martínez was the first person of Spanish ancestry to be elected to the state's top office.
Bill Richardson (November 15, 1947), 30th Governor of New Mexico from 2003-2011.
Bob Menendez (January 1, 1954) is the senior United States senator from New Jersey.

Scientists
Luis F. Alvarez (April 1, 1853 – May 24, 1937), Asturian-born physician and researcher who practiced in both California and Hawaii.
Walter C. Alvarez (1884 – June 18, 1978), doctor.
Severo Ochoa (September 24, 1905 – November 1, 1993), Asturian-born doctor and biochemist, joint winner of the 1959 Nobel Prize in Physiology or Medicine with Arthur Kornberg.
Luis Walter Alvarez (June 13, 1911 – September 1, 1988), experimental physicist and inventor, who spent nearly all of his long professional career on the faculty of the University of California, Berkeley. He was awarded the Nobel Prize in Physics in 1968.
Walter Alvarez (born October 3, 1940), professor in the Earth and Planetary Science department at the University of California, Berkeley. He is most widely known for the theory that dinosaurs were killed by an asteroid impact, developed in collaboration with his father, Nobel Prize–winning physicist Luis Alvarez.

Sports
Lou Piniella (Louis Victor Piniella, born August 28, 1943), former Major League outfielder and manager; nicknamed "Sweet Lou".
Evan Longoria (born October 7, 1985), Major League Baseball third baseman.
Al Lopez (August 20, 1908–2005), former Major League catcher and manager; Member of the Baseball Hall of Fame; nicknamed "El Señor".

See also

Spanish people
Asturian people
Centro Asturiano de Tampa
History of Ybor City
Spanish American
Basque Americans
Catalan American
Galician American
 Canarian American
Hispanic
Hispanic Society of America
Hispanos
 Californio
 Nuevomexicano (Origins of New Mexico Families: A Genealogy of the Spanish Colonial Period)
 Tejano
 Floridanos
Spain–United States relations

References

External links
 Colahan, Clark (2008). Spanish American Heritage. Multicultural America.
 Ramírez, Roberto R. (2004). We the People: Hispanic Population in the United States. Census 2000 Special Reports. U.S. Census Bureau.
 Pérez, Juan M. (October 2005). The Hispanic Role in America. Coloquio Revista Cultural.
Asturian-American Migration Forum. A discussion board for the descendants of Asturian-Americans.